The Secret History of Las Vegas is a 2014 crime novel written by Nigerian-American writer Chris Abani. and published by Penguin Books on 7 January 2014 which later went on to win the Edgar Award for Best Paperback Original in 2015.

References 

Edgar Award-winning works
2014 American novels
American mystery novels
Penguin Books books